The Burrangong Creek, a mostlyperennial stream that is part of the Lachlan sub-catchment of the Murrumbidgee catchment within the Murray–Darling basin, is located in the South West Slopes region of New South Wales, Australia.

Network
Burrangong Creek is only connected to the Murray Darling basin when Bland Creek and both the Lachlan and Murrumbidgee Rivers are in flood.

Burrangong Creek is a tributary of Bland Creek, which descends  over its  course.

See also 
 List of rivers of New South Wales (A-K)
 Rivers of New South Wales

References

Tributaries of the Lachlan River
Rivers of New South Wales